Rubens Ometto Silveira Mello is a Brazilian businessman and the chair of Raízen and Cosan. He is also the director of UNICA.

Biography
Rubens Ometto Silveira Mello was born in Piracicaba, Brazil. He attended the University of São Paulo and interned with Unibanco. After college, he became a financial director for the Votorantim Group, thanks to his mentor Antônio Ermírio de Moraes. He sued his family for a decade to own Cosan.

References

Living people
1950 births
People from Piracicaba
University of São Paulo alumni
Brazilian businesspeople
Brazilian billionaires